Anima Choudhury (born 28 February 1953) is a  singer from the Indian north eastern state of Assam. Her   musical career over more than four decades has focussed on folk and modern Assamese songs. She has been awarded  local and state level musical and cultural recognitions and titles including. "Luit Kuwari", and  "Jan Dimali". Some of her most popular songs are 'Dikhou noir parore', 'Log diyar kotha asil' and 'E pran gopal'.

Supplementing her musical career, Choudhury has also led a  parallel academic life, with a Doctorate degree in history conferred by Gauhati University.

Early life 

Choudhury was born on 28 February 1953 to   Dandiram Choudhury and   Hemalata Choudhury in a small village of Niz Pakowa, Nalbari Assam. Her father was a government officer posted at Nagaon for an extended period where the child was raised as the fifth child in a family of seven siblings. Her  elementary education as well as her  musical lessons started  at Nagaon. Her  household was full of musical influence and her mother began her early awareness of  traditional Assamese music . Her father was a devotee of Indian classical music who encouraged her to get professional training in Hindustani classical music.

She received her early training in music at the music school of Sushil Banerjee. In 1963, when her father was transferred to Guwahati, she started  training in classical music under   Hiren Sarma. She eventually acquired Visharad in classical music. After Sarma's death, she continued her classical training under  Damodar Bora. She also took training from   classical singer   Nirod Roy, and training in Thumri and Bhajan under  Nripen Ganguli, a classical singer of All India Radio.

Academic career 

Choudhury graduated from Cotton College, Gauhati with Honors in History in 1972. She gota  Masters in Arts degree from Gauhati University in History in 1974, and a Doctorate (PhD) degree from that university in 1999 for her   thesis   on "Temples and Shrines in and around Guwahati – A Sociological and Folkloristic Exploration". Until her retirement in 2013, she was   Associate Professor and later as Head of Department of History at Chhaygaon College, Kamrup, Assam.  

She has been invited to many International, national and state level seminars, and has presented research papers on several topics involving culture and music.

Musical career 

In 1969,  Choudhury participated in Cotton college's inter college music competition. Her performance in the statewide event  caught the attention of   music director Ramen Baruah. In 1970   Barua offered her an opportunity as a playback singer in the Assamese film Mukuta, singing   all the female songs of the film. The  songs became chart-busters all across Assam, specially the song "E pran gopal, Patila mayare khela"   . After the success of the film, the record company HMV  invited  Choudhury to have songs and albums recorded under their label. She recorded several Assamese modern songs and Kamrupi Lokagit with HMV. She was a playback singer  in other Assamese films including Putalaghar, Prem Janame Janame, Agnibristi (VDO Film), Mor Maramere (VCD), and  Siba Mahima (VCD). She also provided playback singing for the Bengali film Tridhara in 2013, and  has given her voice for TV serials Maa Manasa, Devi, Vandanand others.  

Since her childhood, she been a regular voice in All India Radio, rendering performances first in 'Akanir Mel' and then in 'Chemoniar Chora'. In 1972 she became an AIR approved artist.   Currently she is an 'A-Grade' artist of All India Radio and Doordarshan   and performs regularly for AIR and Doordarshan, and   also  invited by other private TV channels. In 1989 she represented Assam in the National program of Doordarshan organized by Cuttak Doordarshan.   She has been invited many by   Indian/Assamese organizations in the United States to perform as an ambassador of the Assamese musical heritage.

Awards and recognition 

"Jaan Dimali Bota" 2016 by Jaan publication, Bamunigaon, Kamrup, Assam.  She has been honored as "Luit Kuwari" as part of the felicitation.
"Dr Upen Kakoti Sowarani Bota" 2016 by Dergaon Kendriya Rangali Bihu Utsav.
"Xangkhadhwani Sanman" 2016 by Xangkhadhwani Samajik Sanskritik Mancha Kahilipara, Guwahati.

'LIFETIME ACHIEVEMENT AWARD, 2019' BY 'BASHANTAR EDIN' at Niz Pakowa, Nalbari.

On 2 February 2013, Chhaygaon College organized an inter college competition on Choudhury's modern songs where competitors across Assam from several colleges under Gauhati University   participated.   Similarly, the cultural organization Jontara Kalakendra organized a program called 'Anubhab Mor Pritir Smriti' to honor her at Bejera. 

She was adjudged the best singer of Cotton College for the period 1969–70. She became the best singer of Gauhati University in the year 1973. While in the University, she was the first recipient of the 'Brajen Baruah Award' which had been instituted  by the Directorate of Youth Welfare, Gauhati University. Jontara Kalakendra.

Musical works 

Following is the list of audio albums released during Choudhury's career.

Assamese modern songs 
Asolore Baa
Tezimola Xare Ase
Pritir Smriti (Vol I & ll)
Smriti Anupom
Ai Tor Pujar Bedi
Hiya Jui
Madhoi Maloti
Ei Bohagote
Supohi
Ramdhenu
Kokal Bhangi Nach
Jaan
Majoni
Sapon
Nirabadhi

Folk songs 
Xubash
Amol Mol
Maniki Madhuri
Surar Jinjiri
O Bandhure (Goalporia)
Ram Nam Porene Monot
Antaryami
Tupuni
Manjori
Pran Gopal
Pushpanjoli
Mohon Kanai
Bhakti Sagar
Bin Borage

Bargit 
Madhura Murati
Ram Name Mukuti

Biyanaam 
Anima Choudhury r Biyanam
Na Kaina
Sukanya
Ajoli Boari
Prabhati Kanya

Jyoti Sangit 
Jyotir Gaan
Agnixur Volume III
Sonar Xarai

Bishnu Rabhar Geet 
Agnixur Volume VI
Uti Ja Rupali Nao

Bihu 
Jiyori
Patgabharu
Nayantora

References

External links 
Bio on Rupaliparda 
 

Singers from Assam
1953 births
Assamese playback singers
Assamese-language singers
20th-century Indian singers
Living people
Indian women historians
20th-century Indian historians
Indian women folk singers
Indian folk singers
20th-century Indian women singers
21st-century Indian women singers
21st-century Indian singers
Women musicians from Assam
Educators from Assam
Women educators from Assam
20th-century women writers